The men's decathlon competition at the 1990 European Athletics Championships in Split, Yugoslavia, was held at Stadion Poljud on 28 August and 29 August 1990.

Medalists

Schedule

28 August

29 August

Records

Results

Participation
According to an unofficial count, 29 athletes from 15 countries participated in the event.

 (2)
 (1)
 (3)
 (2)
 (2)
 (2)
 (1)
 (3)
 (2)
 (2)
 (2)
 (1)
 (2)
 (2)
 (2)

See also
 Athletics at the 1988 Summer Olympics – Men's decathlon
 1990 Hypo-Meeting
 1990 Decathlon Year Ranking
 1991 World Championships in Athletics – Men's decathlon

References

External links
 Results
 todor66

Decathlon
Combined events at the European Athletics Championships